Cirulli is an Italian surname. Notable people with the surname include:

Giuseppina Cirulli (born 1959), Italian hurdler
Monica Cirulli (born 1982), Italian synchronized swimmer

See also
Cirelli

Italian-language surnames